Joseph Haydn's Cello Concerto No. 2 in D Major is a cello concerto, Hob. VIIb/2, Op. 101, was for many years thought to have been composed in 1783 for Antonín Kraft, a cellist of Prince Nikolaus's Esterházy Orchestra. New research, published in 2019 by Thomas Tolley and building on discoveries of Simon McVeigh, shows it was neither written for nor debuted by Kraft, an assertion that was made by Kraft's son to musicologist Gustav Schilling, and later repeated in Schilling's influential musical encyclopedias. However, original advertisements in the London press announced that ‘A new Concerto, Violoncello, Mr Cervetto, composed by Haydn’ had its premier on March 24, 1784 at  Hannover Square.  A second performance was advertised a week later as being a ‘Concerto Violoncello, Mr Cervetto, composed by Haydn’. The C major concerto, Haydn's only other violoncello concerto, was, at this point, more than twenty years old.  The soloist of the premiere, James Cervetto (son of noted cellist  Jacob Cervetto) was the principal cellist of the Italian Opera in London and one of England’s leading solo cellists.

The piece's authenticity was doubted for some time, and at one stage it was suggested that Kraft himself had written it, but most experts now believe that the work is indeed authentic after Haydn's autograph score was discovered in 1951.

Music 

The concerto is structured in the usual three movements:
 Allegro moderato
 Adagio
 Rondo (Allegro)

In the first movement of the D Major Concerto, the tone is leisurely and soothing. However, the piece soon enters the development phase, where another theme, building upon the opening theme, is discovered. Finally, the recapitulation returns to the main theme.

In the second movement, the key shifts to the dominant, A major. The tempo marking is "Adagio", slower than many of Haydn's slow movements which are marked "Andante". In the middle of the second movement, there is an episode in the rather distant key C major.

The final movement is the shortest movement of the concerto. It is in rondo form, featuring an episode in the dominant key of A major and a more somber digression in D minor. The work ends with a rather cheerful affirmation, less overtly virtuosic than Haydn's First Cello Concerto.

References

External links

 

Haydn, Cello Concerto No. 2
Concertos by Joseph Haydn
1783 compositions
Compositions in D major